The Arabia Nome was a province in Ancient Egypt (nome being the Greek term for district). It was located in northern Egypt, approximately from the eastern bank of the Nile Delta to the Suez Canal region, and its capital was at Phacusa on the site of what is today known as the city of Faqous in the Sharqiyah governate. It enters the historical record in the mid 4th century BCE after Alexander the Great's invasion of Egypt, when he appoints Cleomenes of Naucratis as governor of the district and as tax collector for all the provinces of Egypt. The name is presumed to have been derived from the large presence of Arabs living in the region although Arabs are noted to have been living elsewhere in Egypt, especially the eastern deserts along the Red Sea coast, in the Fayyum region (Arsinoite Nome) where a city Ptolemais Arabon (Ptolemais of Arabs) was named after them, in the city of Coptos, and in all the major desert oases in the country. In the Egyptian lists it is recorded as the 20th district of Lower Egypt, although the eastern deserts were also referred to at the time as Arabia, as "locations east of the Nile were indicated as being “of Arabia of such-and-such nome.”" The governor of this district was frequently referred to as an Arabarch. During the Roman period, this region was renamed Aegyptus Herculia, and later in the late Byzantine period renamed again to Augustamnica.

References 

Ancient Egypt